Enteric bacteria are bacteria of the intestines, and may refer to:
 Gut flora, which are always present and usually harmless
 Pathogenic bacteria of bacterial gastroenteritis
 The taxonomic family Enterobacteriaceae
 The taxonomic order Enterobacterales